Charles Church may refer to:

People
 Charles Edward Church (1835–1906), Canadian politician
 Charles Lot Church (1777–1864), Nova Scotian politician
 Charles Church (artist) (born 1970), British painter
 Charles Church (businessman) (c. 1944–1989), British businessman and Spitfire enthusiast who co-founded Charles Church Developments
 Charlie Church (1929–2010), Scottish footballer

Places
 Charles Church, Plymouth, a ruined church and war memorial, Devon, England
 Charles' Church, Tallinn, a Lutheran church in Tallinn, Estonia
 St. Charles' Church (disambiguation), churches dedicated to St. Charles

Business
 Charles Church Developments, British upmarket housebuilding company which is now a subsidiary of Persimmon plc

See also
 Charles Churchill (disambiguation)
 

Church, Charles